"For All the Tea in China" is a song by New Zealand singer songwriter Sharon O'Neill. The song was released in March 1982 as the third and final single from her third studio album, Maybe (1981). 
O'Neill performed the song on Countdown.

Track listing 
7" (BA 222918) 
Side A "For All the Tea in China" – 3:19
Side B "I Don't Wanna Touch You (I Just Wanna Ride In Your Car)" – 2:57

Charts

References 

1981 songs
1982 singles
Sharon O'Neill songs
Songs written by Sharon O'Neill